Kuntur Tuqllana (possibly from Quechua kuntur condor, tuqlla trap, -na a suffix, 'where the condor is caught in a trap') is a mountain in the Andes of Peru which reaches a height of approximately . It is located in the Ancash Region, Huari Province, Chana District.

References

Mountains of Peru
Mountains of Ancash Region